Autostrada A36, also called Pedemontana Lombarda, is a motorway in northern Italy that aims to speed up travel in the north of Milan, creating a road outside the Metropolitan City of Milan to connect the province of Varese with that of Bergamo, as well as the Milan Malpensa Airport with the Orio al Serio International Airport.

The section between the link with the A8 at Cassano Magnago and the SP-exSS35 at Lentate sul Seveso was opened between January and November 2015.

References

Buildings and structures completed in 2015
2015 establishments in Italy
A36
Transport in Lombardy